Hesse is a historic plantation house located near Blakes, Mathews County, Virginia. It was built about 1725, and is a five-bay, two-story Georgian style brick dwelling. It has a single-pile plan and is topped by a gable roof. A modern five-bay flanking south wing was built in 1952.

It was listed on the National Register of Historic Places in 1974.

References

Plantation houses in Virginia
Houses on the National Register of Historic Places in Virginia
Georgian architecture in Virginia
Houses completed in 1725
Houses in Mathews County, Virginia
National Register of Historic Places in Mathews County, Virginia
1725 establishments in Virginia